William Charles Gayner (1825 — 27 January 1892) was an English first-class cricketer and barrister.

The son of William Gayner senior, he was born at St James's in 1825. He was educated at St Paul's School, before going up to the University of Oxford where he studied at Pembroke College in 1847, before transferring to St Mary Hall in 1848. Gayner made a single appearance in first-class cricket for the Marylebone Cricket Club (MCC) against Oxford University at Oxford in 1851. Batting twice in the match, he was dismissed for a single run by Charles Marsham, while in their second innings he was dismissed without scoring by Charles Bere. A latecomer to the legal profession, Gayner was called to the bar as a member of the Inner Temple in January 1872. Gayner died at Chelsea in January 1892. He had been the proprietor of Boodle's gentlemen's club until his death.

References

External links

1825 births
1892 deaths
People from Westminster
People educated at St Paul's School, London
Alumni of Pembroke College, Oxford
Alumni of St Mary Hall, Oxford
English cricketers
Marylebone Cricket Club cricketers
Members of the Inner Temple
English barristers